The Sandrangato is a river that flows near Anosibe An'ala, Alaotra-Mangoro Region, Madagascar.
It is located at 72 km from Moramanga.

References

Rivers of Alaotra-Mangoro